Agriterribacter is a Gram-negative, aerobic, non-spore-forming and non-motile genus of bacteria from the family of Chitinophagaceae with one known species (Agriterribacter humi).

References

Chitinophagia
Bacteria genera
Monotypic bacteria genera
Taxa described in 2020